Anubrata Basu (born 5 October 1989 in Calcutta), is a Bengali film actor. Born in India, he started acting through local theatre performances. He received his first commercial acting break with Anjan Dutt's Madly Bangali, where he played one of the main characters, Benji. Since then he has acted in films like Chatrak and Gandu. In Gandu, his performance attracted controversy, as he appears nude, with his penis shown fully erect and engaging in non-simulated on-screen sex. Ever since he is known fondly in the industry as 'The Gandoo'.

Filmography 
 Tasher Desh
 Gandu
 Maach Mishti & More
 Chatrak
 Madly Bangalee
 Bedroom
 Ami Ar Amar Girlfriends
 Chittagong

See also 
 Silajit Majumder, Indian Bengali singer, songwriter, actor

References

External links 
 

Living people
Male actors in Bengali cinema
1989 births